Martin John "Buster" Phillips (born 13 March 1976) is an English former professional footballer.

Life and career 

Phillips was born in Exeter and began his football career as a trainee with his local side Exeter City, turning professional in July 1994. He soon attracted the attention of higher division clubs and moved to Manchester City in November 1995 for a fee of £500,000. This remained Exeter's record sale until they sold Matt Grimes for around £1.75 million in 2015. Upon signing Phillips, City manager Alan Ball predicted "Buster will be the first British £10 million pound player." He struggled to establish himself at Maine Road and was loaned to Scunthorpe United in January 1998 and back to Exeter City in March 1998.

He left Maine Road in August 1998, moving to Portsmouth for a fee of £100,000. Again he struggled to establish himself and spent a month on loan to Bristol Rovers in February 1999. In August 2000 he returned to Devon, joining Plymouth Argyle in August 2000 for a fee of just £25,000. He was released at the end of the 2003–04 season, after spending much of the season struggling with injuries.

He joined Torquay United on a free transfer in July 2004, becoming one of a growing band of former Plymouth players signed by Leroy Rosenior, others including Craig Taylor, Brian McGlinchey, Martin Gritton and Matthew Villis.

In November 2006, the BBC linked him with a possible move back to Exeter City, by now a Conference National side, but the move fell through and Phillips remained at Plainmoor. He failed to appear again for Torquay and in May 2007 he was forced to retire due to suffering chronic fatigue syndrome.

Honours
Plymouth Argyle
 2001-02 Division Three Champions
 2003-04 Division Two Champions

External links

References

1976 births
Living people
People with chronic fatigue syndrome
Sportspeople from Exeter
Footballers from Devon
English footballers
Exeter City F.C. players
Manchester City F.C. players
Scunthorpe United F.C. players
Portsmouth F.C. players
Bristol Rovers F.C. players
Plymouth Argyle F.C. players
Torquay United F.C. players
Premier League players
Association football midfielders